A man is an adult male of the modern human species, its individuals, and nearest extinct relatives. See also man (word) for the etymology.

Man or MAN may also refer to:

Places
 Isle of Man, located in the Irish Sea, part of the British Isles
 Man Island (Andaman and Nicobar Islands), a small uninhabited island in the Bay of Bengal
 Man (Vidhan Sabha constituency), political district in India
 Man Department, Ivory Coast
 Man, Ivory Coast, a town and capital of the department
 Roman Catholic Diocese of Man, Ivory Coast
 Man, West Virginia, a town in the United States
 Man., abbreviation for Manitoba, a Canadian province
 Man, Vikramgad, a village in Maharashtra, India
 Manchester Airport's IATA airport code
 Manchester Piccadilly station's National Rail station code MAN

Music
 Man (band), a Welsh progressive rock group
 Man (Man album), 1971
 Man (Neneh Cherry album), the third solo album by Swedish singer Neneh Cherry, released in 1996
 "Man" (Skepta song), 2016
 "Man" (JoJo song), 2020
 "Man", a 1989 song on the album Staring at the Sun by Level 42
 "Man", a 2003 song on the album Fever to Tell by the Yeah Yeah Yeahs
 "Man", a 2016 song on the album Air for Free by Relient K
 "Man", a 2018 song on the album Blue Madonna by Børns
 "Man", a song by the band The Worst featured in the 2020 Netflix crime documentary series, Unabomber: In His Own Words.

Businesses
 MAN SE, a German engineering company that manufactures (amongst other things) buses and trucks
 Man Group plc, a British financial services company
 The stock symbol of Manpower, Inc., an American employment agency

Political organizations
 Marea Adunare Naţională, the Great National Assembly in Communist Romania
 Mongolian People's Party, a political party in Mongolia
 Movement of Arab Nationalists
 Movimento de Acção Nacional or the National Action Movement (Portugal)
 Movimiento de Acción Nacional or the National Action Movement (Venezuela)
 Partido MAN (Movementu Antia Nobo or New Antilles Movement), a political party in Curaçao

Computing 
 Metropolitan area network, large computer networks usually spanning a campus or a city
 The "man" command, used to retrieve a man page, a software documentation page on Unix and Unix-like operating systems

Other uses
 A chess piece or pawn; sometimes the word "piece" is defined to exclude pawns.
 Man!, American anarchist periodical, 1933–1940
 Man (name) (includes a list of people with the name)
 The Man, derisive slang phrase for higher authority
 Man or Nanman, ancient Chinese ethnic group
 Standard romanization of the Manchu people
 Man (Middle-earth), people in the writings of J. R. R. Tolkien
 Man (journal) (1901–1994), continued by The Journal of the Royal Anthropological Institute
 Man (unit), an ancient Arabic and Persian unit of mass
 "Man", a statue by Virgil Cantini
 Ultraman, a Japanese television series often referred to as "Man"
 In neo-pagan Germanic mysticism, the alternative name of the Norse Algiz rune, where it is used as a purported life rune

See also

 De Man (disambiguation), a list of people with this surname
 Mankind (disambiguation)
 Men (disambiguation)
 The Man (disambiguation)
 The Men (disambiguation)
 Mans (disambiguation)
 Masculinity
 Gentleman